Rivière Salée is French for Salty River, and may refer to :

 Rivière Salée, a river of Martinique.
 Rivière-Salée, a town and commune in Martinique
 Canton of Rivière-Salée, the corresponding Martinique canton
 , a narrow sea-channel separating Grande-Terre and Basse-Terre, the two main islands of the archipelago of Guadeloupe
 River Sallee (Rivière Salée), a village in Grenada